Nice Métropole Côte d'Azur is a French UCI Continental road cycling team established in 2021.

Team roster

References

External links

UCI Continental Teams (Europe)
Cycling teams established in 2021
2021 establishments in France
Cycling teams based in France